Shaogang may refer to these places in China:

Shaogang Township (邵岗乡), a township in Huoqiu County, Anhui
Shaogang, Henan (稍岗), a town in Yucheng County, Henan
Shaogang, Ningxia (邵岗), a town in Qingtongxia, Ningxia

See also
Shaoguan Iron and Steel, a Chinese steel maker based in Shaoguan, Guangdong, colloquially abbreviated as Shaogang in Chinese